The North Konawe mine is a large mine in the east of Indonesia in Sulawesi. North Konawe represents one of the largest nickel reserve in Indonesia having estimated reserves of 498 million tonnes of ore grading 1.36% nickel. The 498 million tonnes of ore contains 6.77 million tonnes of nickel metal.

References 

Nickel mines in Indonesia